Nal Shekan may refer to:
 Nal Shekan, Kermanshah
 Nal Shekan, Kurdistan